Lim Dong-won (born 1934) is a retired South Korean politician who was a top aide during the administration of Kim Dae-jung and a key architect of the Sunshine Policy, holding the post of Unification Minister until losing a no-confidence vote on September 3, 2001; he stepped down after being impeached on December 23, 2001. His involvement in secret payments to North Korea to facilitate the 2000 summit meeting resulted in an 18-month suspended jail sentence in 2003. In 2004 he was named the head of the Sejong Institute. In his retirement he has been critical of United States policy on North Korea. He has also been indicted in connection with an extensive wiretapping scandal uncovered in 2005.

Before joining Kim Dae-jung's administration he had served as head of Kim's Asia-Pacific Peace Foundation; deputy chief of the unification board under Roh Tae-woo; and ambassador to Nigeria and Australia in the 1980s.

References

External links
Interview with PBS, March 1, 2003.
"The South Korean Spy Chief Who Paved the Way for Thaw With North", The International Herald Tribune, January 31, 2001.

1934 births
Living people
Government ministers of South Korea
Ambassadors of South Korea to Australia
Ambassadors of South Korea to Nigeria
Directors of the National Intelligence Service (South Korea)
Korea Military Academy alumni